Da Areia River may refer to:

Da Areia River (Goio-Ere River), a river of Paraná state in southern Brazil
Da Areia River (Iguazu River), a river of Paraná state in southern Brazil